The tetramethylbenzenes constitute a group of substances of aromatic hydrocarbons, which structure consists of a benzene ring with four methyl groups (–CH3) as a substituent. Through their different arrangement, they form three structural isomers with the molecular formula C10H14. They also belong to the group of C4-benzenes. The best-known isomer is durene.

{| class="wikitable" style="text-align:center; font-size:90%"
|-
| class="hintergrundfarbe6" colspan="4" | Tetramethylbenzenes
|-
| class="hintergrundfarbe5" align="left" | Common name
|prehnitene||isodurene||durene
|-
| class="hintergrundfarbe5" align="left" | Systematic name
| 1,2,3,4-tetramethylbenzene || 1,2,3,5-tetramethylbenzene || 1,2,4,5-tetramethylbenzene
|-
| class="hintergrundfarbe5" align="left" | Structural formula
|  ||  || 
|-
| class="hintergrundfarbe5" align="left" | CAS Registry Number
| 488-23-3 || 527-53-7 || 95-93-2
|}

References

Alkylbenzenes
C4-Benzenes